Blanca Amelia Gámez Gutiérrez (born 25 August 1950) is a Mexican politician affiliated with the National Action Party. She served as Deputy of the LIX Legislature of the Mexican Congress as a plurinominal representative, and previously served in the LIX Legislature of the Congress of Chihuahua.

References

1950 births
Living people
Politicians from Chihuahua (state)
Women members of the Chamber of Deputies (Mexico)
Members of the Chamber of Deputies (Mexico)
National Action Party (Mexico) politicians
20th-century Mexican politicians
20th-century Mexican women politicians
21st-century Mexican politicians
21st-century Mexican women politicians
Members of the Congress of Chihuahua
Autonomous University of Chihuahua alumni
Deputies of the LIX Legislature of Mexico